Meg Kissinger is an American investigative journalist and the James Madison Visiting Professor at Columbia University. While working at The Milwaukee Journal-Sentinel, she and Susanne Rust were finalists for the 2009 Pulitzer Prize for Investigative Reporting for their investigation of Bisphenol A. Kissinger has also written extensively about the failures of the mental health system. 

She was born in Wilmette, Illinois, where she attended Regina Dominican High School. She graduated from DePauw University in 1979.

Awards
 2013 George Polk Award for Medical Writing http://www.jsonline.com/news/milwaukee/chronic-crisis-a-system-that-doesnt-heal-milwaukee-county-mental-health-system-210480011.html?ipad=y#!/emergency-detentions/
 2012 Robert F. Kennedy Journalism Award 
 2009 Pulitzer Prize for Investigative Reporting finalist 
 2008 George Polk Award
 2008 John B. Oakes Award for distinguished environmental reporting
 Scripps Howard National Journalism award, 2009 and 2010
 2009 Grantham award of special merit

Work
"Chemical Fallout", Milwaukee Wisconsin Journal Sentinel

References

External links
"Logan Symposium: How the Sausage Is Made? (Journalists)", Berkeley Graduate School of Journalism
"Please Explain: BPA", WNYC, February 
Nieman Storyboard: Meg Kissinger On Writing the Tough Stories
http://www.niemanstoryboard.org/2012/02/08/meg-kissinger-on-writing-the-tough-stories/

American women journalists
Living people
George Polk Award recipients
DePauw University alumni
Milwaukee Journal Sentinel people
Year of birth missing (living people)